The Isla Santa Catalina side-blotched lizard (Uta squamata) is a species of lizard. It is endemic to Isla Santa Catalina in the Gulf of California, Mexico. This species of lizard can be as long as 2.2 inches.

References 

Uta
Lizards of North America
Endemic reptiles of Mexico
Reptiles described in 1919
Taxa named by Mary Cynthia Dickerson